Munro Drive is a suburban pass through the Linksfield Ridge on the Witwatersrand range in Johannesburg, South Africa. It connects the suburbs of Upper and Lower Houghton. The drive is about 900m long and rises around 43m to the summit.

History
The pass is named after John Munro, director of Johannesburg Consolidated Investment Company (JCI). JCI owned the land called the Houghton Estate. It was completed in 1918. The pass was cut through quartz rock allowing access to the newer northern suburbs. It has a u-shape bend and a stone retaining wall, rebuilt in 1938 and made from the local quartz. A viewing site sits close to the top of the pass and looks over the northern suburbs.

External links
 Munro Drive - YouTube

References

Mountain passes of Gauteng